The Euroborg is the stadium in Groningen, Netherlands. It is the home of football club FC Groningen, with a capacity of 22,525 seats. The stadium site houses a casino, movie theater, school, supermarket, and a fitness centre. A temporary railway station at the Euroborg Stadium opened in late 2007, and a permanent one opened in 2013. The stadium's seats are completely clad in the club's colors of green and white, with 1,000 seats available for supporters of the away team.

The stadium
The stadium was built by a consortium of Ballast Nedam, Royal BAM Group and VolkerWessels and completed in 2006.

Besides the nickname de Groene Hel (the Green Hell) it also is called de Groene Kathedraal (the Green Cathedral).

The stadium has had several name changes; at the opening in 2006 the stadium was called the Euroborg, but in 2016 the name was changed to NoordLease stadion. Due to a fusion of companies, the name was changed to Hitachi Capital Mobility Stadion in 2018. Hitachi Capital Mobility changed their official name in 2021 and they removed their name from the stadium.

Access
The Euroborg is easy to reach by public transport, as the train station Groningen Europapark, located 200 meters from the stadium, is served every hour by a number of trains (coming from and going to Groningen Central) and buses. There are also a number of car parks (marked as P1, P2, etc.) in the surrounding area.

2007 UEFA European Under-21 Championship
The Euroborg was also one of four venues for the 2007 UEFA European U-21 Championship, which the Netherlands hosted. It was host to all group matches of Portugal and the final between the Netherlands and Serbia.

Netherlands women's national football team
On October 24, 2017 the Netherlands played Norway at the Euroborg in front of 20,980 spectators as part of the 2019 Women's World Cup qualification. On October 23, 2020 the Netherlands qualified for UEFA Women's Euro 2021 after a victory over Estonia at the Euroborg in front of 0 spectators, due to Covid 19.

References

External links

 

FC Groningen
Football venues in the Netherlands
Sports venues completed in 2005
Sports venues in Groningen (city)